Pure Noise Records is an American punk rock record label based in Nashville, Tennessee. It was founded by Jake Round in 2009 while he was an editor at AMP; the previous fall, friends of his in the band No Bragging Rights told him they were looking for a new label, and Round expressed interest in releasing the album himself. Prior to this Round had a short stint as an intern at Fat Wreck Chords. While the label began as a home operation, and had only put out five albums by the end of 2010, by 2014 some of the label's roster were main-stage acts at Warped Tour, and others had sold nearly 50,000 copies of their albums. Overall, the label's catalog had sold over 280,000 records as of March 2014. Among the label's signings are Vanna and Hit the Lights. In March 2017, Pure Noise Records partnered with Sony Music to create a new music label called Weekday Records.

History 
Originally the label was called Pure Noise Entertainment and was supposed to become a pure concert agency, but Round decided to found a record company after two organized concert tours because he didn't see himself as a promoter of concerts. 
The first release was a CD of the US-American melodic hardcore band No Bragging Rights. At first Round sent demos of the group to various record companies hoping that a label would sign the band. As this did not happen, he decided to produce the album himself. He asked his mother if she could give him money to produce a CD, which she agreed to. At that time he was often in contact with Craig Ericson, the founder of Rise Records, who advised him in the beginning. So The Consequence of Dreams by No Bragging Rights was the first album released by Pure Noise.

From 2008 to 2010 the label operated as its own project and brought just five productions onto the market. In the meantime Pure Noise has signed two bands, Landscapes (England) and The Story So Far, among others, which have been able to achieve a higher degree of popularity. Landscapes toured Europe several times and The Story So Far's second album reached a chart position in the official Billboard charts. In 2014, The Story So Far played for the first time on the main stage of the Warped Tour and have sold almost 50,000 records of their album What You Don't See. With The Finer Things by State Champs (#131) and Angst by Handguns (#155), the label has released two more albums that have made it onto the official US Billboard 200. More than 280,000 records were sold worldwide in the first five years of the record company's existence. Round now shares an office with concert manager Brad Wiseman of the Soroka Agency.

Bands 

Current
 Action/Adventure
 Alex Melton
 The Amity Affliction
 Bearings
 Belmont
 Best Ex
 The Bouncing Souls
 Can't Swim
 Carpool Tunnel
 Chamber
 Cory Wells
 Counterparts
 Devon Kay and the Solutions
 Drug Church
 Dollar Signs
 The Early November
 Eastwood
 Elder Brother
 First Blood
 Four Year Strong
 Gardenhead
 Graduating Life
 Hawthorne Heights
 Homesafe
 Inclination
 Jule Vera
 Just Friends
 Knocked Loose
 Koyo
 Left Behind
 Less Than Jake
 Like Pacific
 Lizzy Farrall

 Masked Intruder
 Meg & Dia
 Microwave
 Mint Green
 Moon Tooth
 The Pink Spiders
 Prince Daddy & The Hyena
 Real Friends
 Reggie and the Full Effect
 Rotting Out
 Sad Park
 Samiam
 Sanction
 The Seafloor Cinema
 Seaway
 SeeYouSpaceCowboy
 Senses Fail
 Selfish Things
 Sharptooth
 Spanish Love Songs
 Speak Low If You Speak Love
 The Spill Canvas
 State Champs
 Stick to Your Guns
 The Story So Far
 Strike Anywhere
 Terror
 Take Offense
 The Warriors
 UnityTX
 Violent Soho (Outside of Australia / New Zealand)
 With Honor
 Year of the Knife
 Youth Fountain

Former
All Shall Perish
 Alex Correia
 The American Scene
 Brigades
 Boston Manor
 Casey Bolles
 Create Avoid
 Daybreaker
 Front Porch Step
 Forever Came Calling
 Gates
 Gnarwolves
 Handguns
 Heart to Heart
 Hit the Lights

 I Call Fives
 Landscapes
 Living with Lions
 Man Overboard
 Matthew Vincent
 Misser
 My Iron Lung 
 No Bragging Rights
 No Good News
 Second to Last
 Sights & Sounds
 To the Wind
 Troubled Coast
 Vanna

Discography

References 

American record labels
Punk record labels
Hardcore record labels
Post-hardcore record labels
Alternative rock record labels
Indie rock record labels
Music of the San Francisco Bay Area
Companies based in Berkeley, California
American independent record labels